The Good Soldier is a 1981 British television drama film directed by Kevin Billington, starring Robin Ellis, Vickery Turner, Jeremy Brett and Susan Fleetwood. It tells the story of two couples that fall apart due to lies and infidelity. The film is based on the 1915 novel of the same name by Ford Madox Ford. It was produced by Granada Television.

Cast
 Robin Ellis as John Dowell
 Vickery Turner as Florence Dowell
 Jeremy Brett as Edward Ashburnham
 Susan Fleetwood as Leonora Ashburnham
 Elizabeth Garvie as Nancy Rufford
 Pauline Moran as Maisie Maidan
 John Ratzenberger as Jimmy
 Geoffrey Chater as Bagshawe
 John Grillo as Herr Schontz
 Roger Hammond as Grand Duke

Release
The Good Soldier premiered on British television in 1981. It was broadcast on the American network PBS in 1983 as an episode of the series Masterpiece Theatre.

Reception
In a contemporary review, the New York Times wrote the series was "adapted beautifully" and "it has been transposed to the television screen splendidly... This is a powerfully intelligent and insightful work." In a 2015 review of the book, Kevin T. Di Camillo called the adaptation "pretty forgettable".

References

1981 television films
1981 films
1980s English-language films
Films based on British novels
Films directed by Kevin Billington
Films set in Germany
Ford Madox Ford
Television shows based on British novels
Films shot in Greater Manchester
1980s British films
British drama television films